Sebastian Moberg (born February 24, 1996) is a Finnish ice hockey defenceman. He is currently playing with HIFK in the Finnish Liiga.

Moberg made his Liiga debut playing with HIFK during the 2014–15 Liiga season.

References

External links

1996 births
Living people
Espoo Blues players
Espoo United players
Finnish ice hockey defencemen
HIFK (ice hockey) players
Kiekko-Vantaa players
Kokkolan Hermes players
Rovaniemen Kiekko players
Sportspeople from Espoo